Edmond Mouche (4 September 1899 – 12 May 1989) was a French racing driver. He drove Porsche's first Le Mans entry and took their first two class wins along with Auguste Veuillet.

Career

Mouche competed in the 1930 Grand Prix de Picardie driving an 1100cc Morano, but did not finish. He entered the 1931 Grand Prix de la Marne at Reims in a Bugatti Type 37A voiturette, but did not appear.

Mouche took part in several races throughout 1947 in his privateer Talbot-Lago T150C. He partnered with José Scaron to finish 8th in Marseille, 10th in Nîmes, and 5th in the 1947 Reims Grand Prix. Following this, Mouche retired from the Grand Prix d'Albi, finished 9th in the Grand Prix d'Alsace in Strasbourg, and finished 8th in the Grand Prix du Comminges. He entered Franco Comotti to the 1947 French Grand Prix in this car, who went on to finish sixth.

In 1948, Mouche won his class at the 24 Hours of Spa with Guy Mairesse. He entered the 12 Hours of Paris at Montlhéry but never started the race.

Mouche began 1949 by finishing second in the Monte Carlo Rally with Maurice Worms. Mouche entered Le Mans with his great friend Auguste Veuillet, driving Veuillet's Delage. The pair ran in third position for most of the race, only to retire with an engine fire in the closing hours. He scored another class victory at the 24 Hours of Spa driving Henri Louveau's Delage.

In 1950, Mouche competed in the inaugural Rallye Automobile Sablé-Solesmes, driving a Delahaye. He raced an Aero Minor twice with Jacques Poch. They entered Le Mans but retired, then went on to finish second in class at the 12 Hours of Paris. He finished sixth at Rouen in a Delahaye with Jean Blanc.

Mouche returned to Sablé-Solesmes in 1951, this time driving a Jaguar. Veuillet, who owned the company Sonauto, had met Ferdinand Porsche at the 1950 Paris Motor Show and convinced the marque to enter two cars for the 1951 24 Hours of Le Mans. Veuillet and Mouche partnered to drive the #46 Porsche 356 SL Coupe under Porsche KG's official works banner and went on to win the S1.1 class, giving Porsche its first class victory on its Le Mans debut. Mouche drove a Hotchkiss Anjou in the newly revived Tour de France later that year, but retired with an accident.

He competed at Sablé-Solesmes in a Simca Aronde in 1952. That year, Mouche and Veuillet returned to Le Mans and repeated their class victory with Porsche. Mouche went on to race a Porsche at Reims but his finishing position is unknown, and at Roubaix where he did not finish.

In 1953, Borgward made their only entry to Le Mans. The factory team entered three cars, with Mouche and Poch reuniting to drive the #41 entry. The pair outlasted Borgward's other two cars but retired in the final hour with overheating. Earlier in the year, Mouche had entered a Borgward to Sablé-Solesmes.

Mouche made his final Le Mans start in 1954, driving the Constantin 203 Barquette with its builder Alexis Constantin. They retired in the early hours of the morning with transmission issues.

Racing record

Complete 24 Hours of Le Mans results

Complete 24 Hours of Spa results

Complete Rallye de Monte Carlo results

References

External links
Edmond Mouche at racingsportscars.com.
Edmond Mouche and "Mouche" at ewrc-results.com.

1899 births
1989 deaths 
French racing drivers
24 Hours of Le Mans drivers
Porsche Motorsports drivers